Lake Hopatcong is the largest freshwater body in New Jersey, United States, about  in area. Lake Hopatcong was produced by damming and flooding of two ponds, known as the Great Pond and Little Pond, and the Musconetcong River, its natural outlet. Historically known as a resort lake for vacationing New Yorkers, it is now a mostly 
suburban residential lake.

Name
The exact origin of the name Hopatcong is unknown, though it is most commonly attributed to the Lenape Indian word for "stone water," or "stone over water". Some linguists believe "Hopatcong" to be a derivative of the Lenape word hapakonoesson, meaning "pipe stone". One explanation of the origin of the word Hopatcong is that it was a derivation from the Lenni Lenape word Huppakong meaning "honey waters of many coves," but this wording was probably invented at the beginning of the 20th century to stimulate tourism.

Before the late 1700s, Lake Hopatcong was known by several names, including Great Pond and Little Pond (before flooding into a single lake), Sandhay Sea (circa 1648), Brookland Pond (mid-1700s), and Musconetcong Pond (1769).

Lake formation
Before the last ice age, the waters of the prehistoric Hopatcong basin fed into the Raritan River. The glacier that shaped much of the New Jersey Highlands formed a long terminal moraine that forced water from the basin into the Musconetcong River.

In the early 1700s, the Great Pond stretched between Henderson Bay and today's Hopatcong State Park. Little Pond was a small body of water to the south of Woodport. The two lakes were first dammed in 1750. By 1831, Lake Hopatcong had been flooded to nearly its current shape.

History

Native Americans
The Lenape Indians discovered the area of Lake Hopatcong about 12,000 years ago. They settled near the Great Pond and Little Pond, which provided abundant fish and forested shores with ample game. The waters became important to the traditions of the matrilineal clans of Native Americans.

Colonial development

Colonial exploration of the Great and Little Ponds began in the 1600s. By this time, most of the local Lenape population had died of disease or left the area.

In the years that followed the American Revolution, little development occurred near Lake Hopatcong because of the mountainous terrain.

Industrialization

In 1831, the Morris Canal Company purchased the Brookland Forge site and replaced the dam with its own, with the intention of using the lake water to supply the Morris Canal, which would connect Phillipsburg to Newark.

The flooding and subsequent formation of a single, large lake created a new geography of the area. Halsey Island and Raccoon Island, the only two true islands on Lake Hopatcong, were disconnected from the mainland. Bertrand Island and Liffy Island formed as peninsulas. Other changes included the creation of Prospect Point, the backflowing of the River Styx in Hopatcong to create an inlet, and King Cove and the south end of the lake near Landing.

In the 1850s, the Morris and Essex became the first railroad to reach Lake Hopatcong on the southern end. In the 1860s, the Ogden Mine Railroad used Nolan's Point to transfer ore from northern New Jersey mines into canal boats. The railroad and canal systems were the chief means of transporting coal, iron, and zinc across New Jersey in the 1860s.

Resort destination
 
In 1882, passenger rail service came to Lake Hopatcong, brought by the Central Railroad of New Jersey, which terminated at Nolan's Point. This turned the lake into a popular summer resort.

Among the hotels built to support the growing tourism industry was the luxurious Breslin Hotel, constructed in Van Every Cove in Mount Arlington with 250 rooms and electricity. During the peak summer season, the lake was so popular that hotel rooms were difficult to come by and some visitors resorted to camping near the lake.

Various amusements sprang up around the lake. Bertrand Island Amusement Park was open for the late spring, summer, and early fall seasons. The island also hosted beauty pageants, including an unofficial 1934 Miss America. The Lake Hopatcong Yacht Club, constructed in 1910 on Bertrand Island, remains a landmark.

Lake Hopatcong hosted several strong chess tournaments in the 1920s, including the Ninth American Chess Congress in 1923, which was won by Frank Marshall and Abraham Kupchik, and another tournament in 1926, which was won by world champion José Raúl Capablanca.

Lake Hopatcong flourished in the 1920s, and many famous people owned property on the lake, including Vaudeville's Joe Cook, who owned Sleepless Hollow in Davis Cove; Vaudeville's Owen McGiveney (father to Maura McGiveney), who owned a house in the River Styx section for more than 30 years; actress Lotta Crabtree, who owned the Attol Tryst home in Mount Arlington; and inventor and chemist Hudson Maxim. Their presence attracted many famous visitors, including Babe Ruth, Bud Abbott, Bert Lahr, and Milton Berle.

Conversion to residential lake
Tourism and other business endeavors near the lake, hit hard by the Great Depression, waned in the 1930s and 1940s. Permanent residences were constructed in the area, including small bungalows, in the 1940s and '50s. Much of the modern residential development surrounding the lake was completed in the 1960s and '70s.

21st century

2000 flood
Doppler radar estimates of total rainfall for the 4-day period reached about  along the border between Sussex and Morris Counties. A severe thunderstorm on August 12 dropped so much rain in six hours that it was judged a 1,000-year event.

Peak flows at the USGS gauges on Lake Hopatcong (01455400) and Musconetcong River (01455500), among others, were the highest ever recorded. These gauges are at sites that drain areas that received 10 or more inches of rain during August 11–14. Peak flows on Lake Hopatcong and on the Musconetcong River just downstream from the lake exceeded those of a 100-year flood.

Lake Hopatcong sustained flooding damage, particularly the Great Cove area at Nolan's Point.

2008-09 drawdown
Every five years, starting the day after Labor Day, the New Jersey Department of Environmental Protection’s (DEP) water level management plan allows the lake to be lowered  to allow for inspection of the dam structure, property owners’ repairs to lakeshore structures, aquatic vegetation control, and silt and drainage material removal from areas around the lake.

From December 2008 to January 2009, the DEP left the dam open almost three weeks too long, which caused the water level to drop almost a foot (0.3 m) below the normal drawdown level. A coalition of residents and business owners filed suit against the DEP and the State of New Jersey, as of 2009 it was being appealed in local court.

On May 11, 2009, the American Power Boat Association (APBA) and the Lake Hopatcong Racing Association (LHRA) decided to postpone their annual races due to the low water level. However, with the large amount of rainfall that was recorded in the month of June, the lake returned to its proper level above the normal average depth. The return of the water level came just in time for the beginning of summer and the arrival of the weather required for boating.

In July 2014, there were reports of a  boa constrictor seen in the lake, but officials by August mostly figured it was a myth or a hoax. According to one report, the reports caused a 10% drop in tourism to the lake during the summer of 2014.

Today
Lake Hopatcong is now mostly a residential lake whose few public access points include Hopatcong State Park and Lee's County Park Marina. Most of the shoreline is privately owned by individual lakefront residents, homeowner or community associations, or private businesses (e.g., restaurants and marinas).

Lake Hopatcong, unlike most lakes in New Jersey (other than Greenwood Lake on the New York border and Lake Lackawanna in Byram), has bars and restaurants that are accessible directly by boat. Popular tourist attractions on the lake include the Hopatcong State Park, the Lake Hopatcong Historical Museum, and the Lake Hopatcong Yacht Club.

On November 22, 2005, the EPA gave the Lake Hopatcong Commission a federal grant of $745,000 to improve the water quality and prevent phosphorus from entering the lake.

Lake management
Lake Hopatcong is shared by two counties (Sussex and Morris) and four boroughs and townships (Mount Arlington, Hopatcong, Jefferson Township, and Roxbury Township).

At some point in the 20th century, decisions about lake management were shaped by the state-funded Lake Hopatcong Regional Planning Board, which made recommendations to the state. Made up of representatives from each town, county, and the state, the board proved ineffective. Weeds proliferated, water quality declined, and recreation suffered.

In January 2001, Governor of New Jersey Christine Whitman signed a bill to create the Lake Hopatcong Commission, a state-funded governing body with an annual budget to maintain, upgrade and protect the lake. The commission consists of 11 members: a representative from Morris county, Sussex county, Hopatcong, Jefferson Twp, Mount Arlington, and Roxbury Twp, and five state members, including one from the Department of Environmental Protection and one from Community Affairs. The chairperson of the commission and two other public members are appointed by the governor.

But the commission has seen annual budget cuts since its inception, and has provided little more than weed harvesting services. In 2012, the state took over the weed harvesting services through Hopatcong State Park. The Lake Hopatcong Commission was not provided state funding for 2013 and now operates solely on grants. The commission administrator was laid off on December 21, 2012, and administrative responsibilities for grants are managed by Jefferson Township.

Wildlife

With the probable exception of the Delaware River, Lake Hopatcong is home to the greatest variety of gamefish species of any waterway in New Jersey.

Each spring, the New Jersey Division of Fish and Wildlife stocks the lake with rainbow trout, and in past years also stocked brook and brown trout, although they have not typically held over and survived the summers, due to an absence of cold, deep, oxygenated pockets of water in the lake. Largemouth bass, smallmouth bass, sunfish, yellow and white perch, rock bass, bluegill, crappie, chain pickerel, channel catfish, bullhead, and carp all inhabit the lake. Eels also have been caught. Hybrid striped bass, walleye, and most recently, muskellunge have been stocked within the last few decades and now are thriving. Catfish also are stocked from time to time. The main forage is the abundant alewife herring, (Clupea vernalis), the basis of the lake's fish food chain.

References

External links
Lake Hopatcong State Park
Lake Hopatcong Historical Museum
Hopatcong Website
Landing, NJ on Lake Hopatcong
Lake Hopatcong Foundation 

Reservoirs in New Jersey
Lakes of Morris County, New Jersey
Lakes of Sussex County, New Jersey
Musconetcong River